The Karamagara Bridge ("Bridge of the Black Cave") is a Byzantine or late Roman bridge in the ancient region of Cappadocia in eastern Turkey, and possibly the earliest known pointed arch bridge.

The bridge, along with much of the Arapgir Çayı valley, has been submerged since the completion of the Keban Dam in 1975, as a result of which the water level in the Euphrates valley and some of its upstream tributaries dramatically rose.

Location and situation 
The single arch of 17 m spans between the cliffs of the rocky gorge of the Arapgir Çayı, an affluent of the Euphrates.

The structure belonged to the Roman road to Melitene, which was cut into the rock near the bridge at both sides of the river. Its name Karamağara ("black cave") probably derives from an artificially widened cavern on the southern bank which was carved into the darkish rock 75 m above the structure and served for protection of the crossing point. The bridge was quite frequently mentioned by early European travellers.

As with other monuments in the region, the site was examined by the Middle East Technical University of Ankara prior to its flooding. Further downstream, at the village of Bahadın, the remains of another now submerged Roman bridge may indicate the existence of an older crossing point.

Pointed arch 
The pointed arch rib was built without mortar between the voussoirs. On its eastern, downstream side a nearly intact Christian inscription in Greek runs along most of its length, citing almost verbatim Psalm 121, verse 8 of the Bible. The text reads:

A paleographic analysis of the Greek letter forms yields a 5th- or 6th-century AD construction date for the bridge. With the bulk of Roman masonry bridges resting on semi-circular arches, or, to a lesser extent, on segmental arches, the Karamagara Bridge represents an equally rare and early instance of the use of pointed arches not only in late antique bridge building, but also in the history of architecture overall. Along with other late Roman and Sassanian examples, mostly evidenced in early church building in Syria and Mesopotamia, the bridge proves the pre-Islamic origin of the pointed arch in Near Eastern architecture, which the Muslim conquerors subsequently adopted and built on. The stones containing the Greek inscriptions were removed from the bridge and brought to the Elazığ Museum in 1972.

See also 
 List of Eastern Roman inventions

References

Sources

Further reading 
 

Roman bridges in Turkey
Deck arch bridges
Stone bridges in Turkey
Cappadocia (Roman province)
Roman-era Greek inscriptions
Buildings and structures in Elazığ Province
Arch bridges in Turkey